The Marshall Scholarship is a postgraduate scholarship for "intellectually distinguished young Americans [and] their country's future leaders" to study at any university in the United Kingdom. It is widely considered one of the most prestigious scholarships for U.S. citizens, and along with the Fulbright Scholarship, it is the only broadly available scholarship available to Americans to study at any university in the United Kingdom.

Created by the Parliament of the United Kingdom in 1953 as a living gift to the United States in recognition of the generosity of Secretary of State George C. Marshall and the Marshall Plan in the wake of World War II, the goal of the scholarship was to strengthen the Special Relationship between the two countries for "the good of mankind in this turbulent world." The scholarships are awarded by the Marshall Aid Commemoration Commission and are largely funded by the British government. The program was also the first major co-educational British graduate scholarship; one-third of the inaugural cohort in 1954 were women. With nearly 1,000 university-endorsed and selected applicants in recent years, it is among the most selective graduate scholarship for Americans, with an acceptance rate of around four percent, and as low as 3.2 percent in 2015.

There are over 1,900 Marshall Scholar alumni. Many of these alumni have achieved distinctions and hold prestigious careers. In the government, current alumni include Associate Justices of the Supreme Court of the United States, the director of the CIA, members of Congress and presidential cabinets, and state governors. Alumni are CEOs of companies such as LinkedIn and Dolby Labs, and managing editors of Time magazine and CNN. They are also deans of Yale Law School, Stanford Law School, the Harvard Kennedy School and Harvard College; and presidents of Duke University, Wellesley College, the Cooper Union, and Caltech. They also include a Nobel Laureate, a winner of the Kluge Prize, four Pulitzer Prize–winning authors, twelve MacArthur Genius Grant awardees, NASA's youngest astronaut, two Oscar nominees, and one awardee of the Distinguished Flying Cross for service during the Iraq War.

History

Plans to establish Marshall Scholarships as a living memorial to United States Secretary of State George C. Marshall was announced by British Foreign Secretary Anthony Eden on 31 July 1952 and were enacted by the Parliament of the United Kingdom with the Marshall Aid Commemoration Act 1953. The act's passage was backed by "leaders of all political hues," with British Foreign Secretary Ernest Bevin describing the scholarship's establishment as "a great opportunity for Europe."

While the authors of the proposal initially considered partnering with the Rhodes Scholarship and even considered using the same selection committees, this idea was eventually disregarded because its proponents strongly believed the scholarships should be available to women, and to married men under the age of 28; at the time, the Rhodes Scholarship was limited to single men under the age of 25. The creation of a separate scholarship was a cause of great concern to Lord Godfrey Elton, the head of the Rhodes Trust at the time, who worried that the ability to study at other universities would draw potential applicants. He urged the Foreign Office to create a "reverse exchange" for British students in the United States instead. The Rhodes Scholarship became open to women beginning in 1977 following the passage of the British Sex Discrimination Act in 1975.

In 1959, when Parliament doubled the number of scholars from 12 to 24, British politician Philip Noel-Baker argued that "Marshall, more than perhaps any other man, destroyed isolation in the United States and built up the conception that only collective security through international institutions can save the world…I think the world has never seen an act of greater national generosity than Marshall aid and the other aid which the United States has given to other continents throughout the last 15 years." By 1960, six years after its establishment, the scholarship was "on its way to becoming as well-known and respected as the fellow phrase, "Rhodes [Scholarship]," and both scholarships attracted roughly 500 to 600 applicants.

As part of the celebrations for the 50th Anniversary of the Marshall Scholarships in 2003, a Marshall Medal was awarded to distinguished Americans in recognition of their contributions to UK-US relations, including Stephen Breyer (1959 Marshall Scholar), Ray Dolby (1957 Marshall Scholar), Thomas L. Friedman (1975 Marshall Scholar) and Nannerl Keohane (1961 Marshall Scholar).

The number of scholars increased to thirty in 1973, forty in 1991, and 44 between 2004-2007. In 2010, the commission decided to offer a limited number of one-year awards. In 2016, the Foreign Office announced that forty scholars had been selected, a 25 percent increase over the originally planned 32, with Foreign Office Minister Alok Sharma calling it a demonstration of how "resolute Britain is in its commitment to the special relationship."

In the early years of the Marshall Scholarship, it was common for new scholars to travel together to the UK on an ocean liner, but now scholars are usually flown together to London from Washington, D.C. following a welcome program with top United Kingdom and United States government and diplomatic officials.

Objectives 
In a letter to the first class of Marshall Scholars, George Marshall echoed his own words in initially presenting his ideas for European recovery by saying, "A close accord between our two countries is essential to the good of mankind in this turbulent world of today, and that is not possible without an intimate understanding of each other. These scholarships point the way to the continuation and growth of the understanding which found its necessity in the terrible struggle of the war years."

The published objectives of the Marshall Scholarships are outlined as follows:
 To enable intellectually distinguished young Americans, their country's future leaders, to study in the UK.
 To help scholars gain an understanding and appreciation of contemporary Britain.
 To contribute to the advancement of knowledge in science, technology, the humanities and social sciences, and the creative arts at Britain's centres of academic excellence.
 To motivate scholars to act as ambassadors from the U.S. to the UK and vice versa throughout their lives thus strengthening British American understanding.
 To promote the personal and academic fulfillment of each scholar.

Selection 
Prospective applicants must first be endorsed by their universities to apply. The selection process is then coordinated through the eight major British embassy/consulate regions in the United States (Atlanta, Boston, Chicago, Houston, Los Angeles, New York, San Francisco, and Washington, D.C.). Selection committees in each region, consisting of former scholars and other distinguished individuals, receive university-endorsed applications (including personal statements and essays) which are used to select a short list of candidates for interviews. Each committee then interviews each of the regional finalists before making the final decisions on the year's awards. In 2014, sixteen percent of university-endorsed applicants received an interview.

Although most of the responsibility for selecting the recipients is in the hands of the committees, a few formal guidelines have been outlined in the official selection criteria, most notably:

As future leaders, with a lasting understanding of British society, Marshall Scholars will strengthen the enduring relationship between the British and American peoples, their governments, and their institutions. Marshall Scholars are talented, independent, and wide-ranging in their interests, and their time as Scholars will enhance their intellectual and personal growth. Their direct engagement with Britain through its best academic programmes will contribute to their ultimate personal success. In appointing Scholars the selectors will look for a distinction of intellect and character as evidenced both by their scholastic attainments and by their other activities and achievements. Preference will be given to candidates who display the potential to make a significant contribution to their own society. Selectors will also look for strong motivation and seriousness of purpose, including the presentation of a specific and realistic academic programme.Between 900 and 1000 students are typically endorsed to apply for the Marshall Scholarship annually. In 2015 and 2016, 3.2 and 3.5 percent of university-endorsed applicants to the Marshall Scholarship were elected. In 2020, 1,000 students were endorsed, 160 interviewed, and 46 selected.

The Marshall selection committees place a strong emphasis on academic achievement and potential, and as such the application requires a minimum GPA of 3.7. Successful applicants, however, typically have much higher GPAs—more than half of applicants have perfect academic records. Winners from Harvard University have had average GPA of 3.92, and Stanford University recommends that applicants have a GPA of 3.8 or above.

Between 1954 and 2022, 256 of 2,179 scholars received their undergraduate degrees from Harvard University (12 percent), 138 from Princeton University, 125 from Yale University, 94 from Stanford University, and 83 from the Massachusetts Institute of Technology. Among public universities, the top producers are the United States Military Academy, with 47 scholars, followed by the United States Naval Academy (34 scholars) and the University of California, Berkeley (33 scholars). The following table includes those institutions that have produced 30 or more scholars since 1954.

Academic destinations 
Nine institutions are traditionally the main destinations of selected Marshall Scholars: University of Oxford, University of Cambridge, London School of Economics, University College London, University of Edinburgh, King's College London and Imperial College London. SOAS and the London School of Hygiene & Tropical Medicine have also sometimes been highly preferred.

In 2015, there were 69 Marshall Scholars in residence at British universities including those who were selected for the classes of 2012, 2013 and 2014. During this time, there were 27 scholars at the University of Oxford, seventeen at the University of London (including five each at the London School of Economics and King's College London, and one at University College London), thirteen at the University of Cambridge, and four at Imperial College London. Of these scholars, 46 were studying arts and social sciences while 23 were studying science, engineering or mathematics.

Comparison to other post-graduate scholarships

In structure and selection criteria, the Scholarship is most similar to the American Rhodes Scholarship and the Fulbright Program. Like the Fulbright available for study in the United Kingdom, Marshall Scholars can study at any university in the UK. However, under the Fulbright, applicants compete in separate pools for 43 specified universities of varying selectivity, except for two awards tenable at any university.

The Marshall Scholarship is more flexible than the Rhodes Scholarship, in that Marshall Scholars can study at any British university, and can also attend a different university each year during a Scholar's tenure. In addition, a limited number of one-year Marshall scholarships are available. Unlike Rhodes Scholars, Marshall Scholars must be American citizens (in comparison, approximately eighty Rhodes Scholarships are given annually to citizens of over a dozen countries). In the process, the Marshall Scholarship is roughly as selective as the Rhodes and Mitchell Scholarships: the Marshall was awarded to 3.4 percent of university-endorsed applicants in 2014, compared to 3.7 percent for the Rhodes in 2014, and 3.2 percent for the Mitchell Scholarship in 2017. The Gates Cambridge Scholarship is slightly more selective with 1.3% of applicants receiving an award. Also, because the selection processes of the scholarships discussed above differ, the likelihood that an applicant will be granted a final round interview is different for each scholarship. In 2014, 15.9 percent of university-endorsed applicants for the Marshall Scholarship received a finalist interview, compared to 24 percent of Rhodes applicants and 5.4 percent of Mitchell applicants.

While the selection committees continue to emphasize academic potential, over time "the Marshall program has become more Rhodes-like, stating that it is seeking persons who also demonstrate leadership potential." In general, "nearly all Rhodes Scholars are willing to admit that, by and large, the Marshalls are superior if one looks just at grade point averages and other signs of academic achievement," but this is a point of both "admiration" and "disdain." Walter Isaacson, describing Rhodes Scholars as "fairly intelligent, well-rounded, honest people who could be counted on to be upstanding citizens," has said that "the real geniuses...were the Marshall Scholars," perhaps because of the expectation that Rhodes Scholars be "all-rounders." In practice, the Marshall and Rhodes have engaged an "informal rivalry," but in career trajectory after the completion of their fellowships, "the line between [the fellowships] is not so evident," with scholars pursuing similar fields with similar success. In general, a higher percentage of Marshall Scholars "go on to careers in academia and research, whereas Rhodes Scholars are more evenly scattered through the full range of professional occupations."

Association of Marshall Scholars
The Association of Marshall Scholars (AMS) was formed in 1988 as a charitable organization.

The organization has been led by several notable board and advisory members, including Kathleen Sullivan, Reid Hoffman, Nannerl Keohane, Peter Orszag, Harold Koh, Roger Tsien and Daniel Yergin.

In 2017 the Association of Marshall Scholars, in partnership with the German Marshall Fund and the British Embassy, Washington, hosted the Harvard Marshall Forum at Harvard University to mark the 70th anniversary of the Marshall Plan and focused on its legacy and impact today. The event featured 30 speakers including Madeleine Albright as well as Supreme Court Justices Stephen Breyer and Neil Gorsuch, both Marshall Scholars.

In 2018, the AMS partnered with the British Consulate General in San Francisco and the Bechtel International Center at Stanford University to host a Marshall Forum on Innovation. The Forum focused on the pipeline of scientific invention in fields such as biomedicine and genetics that are of particular interest to the United States and the United Kingdom. Distinguished speakers included Reid Hoffman, a Marshall Scholar, and David Reitze, Director of LIGO Laboratory. The forum highlighted societal challenges and opportunities raised by explosive innovations in these fields as they interact with advances in machine learning, artificial intelligence, and data science.

In 2019, the AMS hosted the Marshall Forum with the Carnegie Endowment for International Peace, focusing on peace and prosperity. The Forum featured 17 speakers including the Governor of the Bank of England Mark Carney, the Director of U.S. National Security Agency General Paul Nakasone, former U.S. Ambassadors Michael Froman, Carla Hills, and William J. Burns, and former British Ambassador to the United States Kim Darroch.

The Association of Marshall Scholars releases an annual public opinion poll in partnership with Emerson College in Boston, Massachusetts. The poll measures the American public's perceptions of the United Kingdom.

Notable Marshall Scholars

See also 
 Churchill Scholarship at University of Cambridge
 Fulbright Scholarship
 Gates Cambridge Scholarship at University of Cambridge
 Harry S. Truman Scholarship
 Knight-Hennessy Scholarship at Stanford University
 Mitchell Scholarship at universities in the Republic of Ireland and Northern Ireland
 Rhodes Scholarship at University of Oxford
 Schwarzman Scholarship at Tsinghua University 
 Yenching Scholars at Peking University
 Jardine Scholarship at University of Oxford and University of Cambridge

References 

 
Scholarships in the United Kingdom
Higher education in the United Kingdom
Scholarships in the United States
1953 establishments in the United Kingdom
United Kingdom–United States relations
International educational organizations
Student exchange